Anthidiellum is a genus of rotund resin bees in the family Megachilidae. There are more than 60 described species in Anthidiellum.

Species
These 66 species belong to the genus Anthidiellum:

 Anthidiellum absonulum (Cockerell, 1932)
 Anthidiellum anale (Friese, 1914)
 Anthidiellum apicale (Cresson, 1878)
 Anthidiellum apicatum (Smith, 1879)
 Anthidiellum apicepilosum (Dover, 1929)
 Anthidiellum azteca (Urban, 2001)
 Anthidiellum bilobatum (Friese, 1917)
 Anthidiellum bimaculatum (Friese, 1914)
 Anthidiellum bipectinatum Pasteels, 1984
 Anthidiellum biroi (Friese, 1909)
 Anthidiellum bolivianum (Urban, 2001)
 Anthidiellum boreale Wu, 2004
 Anthidiellum breviusculum (Pérez, 1890)
 Anthidiellum bulawayense Mavromoustakis, 1937
 Anthidiellum butarsis Griswold, 2001
 Anthidiellum coloratulum (Pasteels, 1972)
 Anthidiellum coronum Wu, 2004
 Anthidiellum crassepunctatum (Popov, 1935)
 Anthidiellum crenulatum (Warncke, 1982)
 Anthidiellum cyreniacum (Gribodo, 1925)
 Anthidiellum ehrhorni (Cockerell, 1900)
 Anthidiellum eiseni (Cockerell, 1913)
 Anthidiellum eritrinum (Friese, 1915)
 Anthidiellum flavescens (Friese, 1925)
 Anthidiellum forsteni (Ritsema, 1874)
 Anthidiellum hondurasicum (Cockerell, 1949)
 Anthidiellum ignotum Engel, 2009
 Anthidiellum krombeini Griswold, 2001
 Anthidiellum latipes (Bingham, 1897)
 Anthidiellum ludiense Wu, 1992
 Anthidiellum madli Pauly, 2001
 Anthidiellum mediale Pasteels, 1984
 Anthidiellum melanaspis Cockerell, 1929
 Anthidiellum melanocephalum (Cockerell, 1920)
 Anthidiellum meliponiforme (Cockerell, 1919)
 Anthidiellum micheneri Pauly, 2001
 Anthidiellum nigriceps (Friese, 1914)
 Anthidiellum nigripes (Friese, 1904)
 Anthidiellum notatum (Latreille, 1809)
 Anthidiellum orichalciscopatum (Strand, 1912)
 Anthidiellum otavicum (Cockerell, 1936)
 Anthidiellum pamae Eardley, 2018
 Anthidiellum perplexum (Smith, 1854)
 Anthidiellum polyochrum Mavromoustakis, 1937
 Anthidiellum ramakrishnae (Cockerell, 1919)
 Anthidiellum rasorium (Smith, 1875)
 Anthidiellum rubellum (Friese, 1917)
 Anthidiellum ruficeps (Friese, 1914)
 Anthidiellum rufomaculatum (Cameron, 1902)
 Anthidiellum scutellatum Wu, 2004
 Anthidiellum smithii (Ritsema, 1874)
 Anthidiellum solomonis (Krombein, 1951)
 Anthidiellum somaliense Eardley, 2018
 Anthidiellum spilognathum (Cockerell, 1936)
 Anthidiellum spilotum (Cockerell, 1920)
 Anthidiellum sternale Pasteels, 1984
 Anthidiellum strigatum (Panzer, 1805)
 Anthidiellum tegwaniense (Cockerell, 1914)
 Anthidiellum toltecum (Cresson, 1878)
 Anthidiellum transversale Pasteels, 1984
 Anthidiellum turneri (Friese, 1909)
 Anthidiellum xilitlense (Urban, 2001)
 Anthidiellum yunnanense Wu, 1962
 Anthidiellum zebra (Friese, 1904)

References

External links

 

Megachilidae
Bee genera
Articles created by Qbugbot